Parinya Chuaimaroeng (born 16 December 1997 in Udon Thani) is a Thai long and triple jumper.

In the triple jump she finished sixth at the 2017 Asian Indoor Games, won the bronze medal at the 2017 Southeast Asian Games, won the silver medal at the 2018 Asian Games, finished seventh at the 2018 Continental Cup and won the gold medal at the 2019 Asian Championships.

In the long jump she won the silver medal at the 2016 Asian Junior Championships, finished ninth at the 2016 World U20 Championships, sixth at the 2017 Southeast Asian Games and seventh at the 2018 Asian Games.

Her personal best jumps are 14.17 metres, achieved in May 2018 in Taipei; and 6.41 metres, achieved in May 2018 in Bangkok.

References

1997 births
Living people
Parinya Chuaimaroeng
Parinya Chuaimaroeng
Athletes (track and field) at the 2018 Asian Games
Parinya Chuaimaroeng
Southeast Asian Games medalists in athletics
Parinya Chuaimaroeng
Asian Games medalists in athletics (track and field)
Medalists at the 2018 Asian Games
Competitors at the 2017 Southeast Asian Games
Competitors at the 2019 Southeast Asian Games
Parinya Chuaimaroeng
Parinya Chuaimaroeng
Asian Athletics Championships winners
Competitors at the 2021 Southeast Asian Games
Parinya Chuaimaroeng
Parinya Chuaimaroeng